Allostigma is a genus of flowering plants belonging to the family Gesneriaceae.

Its native range is Southern China.

Species:

Allostigma guangxiense

References

Didymocarpoideae
Gesneriaceae genera